The West Midlands Green Belt is a statutory green belt environmental and planning policy that regulates the rural space within the West Midlands region of England. It is contained within the counties of the West Midlands, Shropshire, Staffordshire, Warwickshire and Worcestershire. Essentially, the function of the green belt is to more rigorously manage development around the cities, towns and villages in the large West Midlands conurbations centred around Birmingham and Coventry, discouraging convergence. It is managed by local planning authorities on guidance from central government.

Geography
Tracts of green belt lie within the West Midlands county itself, much of it by the Meriden Gap in Solihull borough; however, the vast coverage of the green belt completely envelops the county.

The green belt stretches from Stafford and Telford through to Stratford-upon-Avon, Warwick, and Rugby. There is a small isolated portion of green belt separating Droitwich Spa and Worcester.

Due to the West Midlands green belt extending across several counties, responsibility and co-ordination lies with the many local district councils whose land covers the green belt, as these are the local planning government bodies.

References

External links
 Interactive map of green belt land

Green belts in the United Kingdom
Environment of the West Midlands (county)
West Midlands (region)